The 2021–22 Lehigh Mountain Hawks men's basketball team represented Lehigh University in the 2021–22 NCAA Division I men's basketball season. The Mountain Hawks, led by 15th-year head coach Brett Reed, played their home games at Stabler Arena in Bethlehem, Pennsylvania as members of the Patriot League.

Previous season
The Mountain Hawks finished the 2020–21 season 4–11, 4–10 in Patriot League play to finish in third place in the Central Division. In the first round of the Patriot League tournament, they were defeated by Boston University.

Roster

Schedule and results

|-
!colspan=12 style=| Non-conference regular season

|-
!colspan=12 style=| Patriot League regular season

|-
!colspan=9 style=| Patriot League tournament

Sources

References

Lehigh Mountain Hawks men's basketball seasons
Lehigh Mountain Hawks
Lehigh Mountain Hawks men's basketball
Lehigh Mountain Hawks men's basketball